Shahriar (also Romanized as Shahrīār) is a village in Zarqan Rural District, Zarqan District, Shiraz County, Fars Province, Iran. At the 2006 census, its population was 2,581, in 551 families.

References 

Populated places in Zarqan County